Christian Mumenthaler (born 21 June 1969) is a Swiss citizen and current Group Chief Executive Officer of Swiss Re, a position he has held since July 1 2016.

Education 
Mumenthaler holds a PhD from the Institute of Molecular Biology and Biophysics at the Swiss Federal Institute of Technology in Zürich.

Career 
Christian Mumenthaler started his career in 1997 as an associate with the Boston Consulting Group. He joined Swiss Re in 1999 and was responsible for key company projects. In 2002, he established and headed the group retro and syndication unit. Christian Mumenthaler served as group chief risk officer between 2005 and 2007 and was head of life and health between 2007 and 2010. In January 2011, he was appointed chief marketing officer reinsurance and member of the group executive committee, and became chief executive officer reinsurance that October. The World Economic Forum appointed Christian Mumenthaler as a Young Global Leader from 2005-2010. Christian Mumenthaler has a Ph.D. from the Institute of Molecular Biology and Biophysics at the Swiss Federal Institute of Technology (ETH) in Zurich.

Prior to his career in business, he created the 1994 Amiga computer game Colonial Conquest II, and made covers for albums by industrial music acts such as Front Line Assembly and X Marks the Pedwalk.

Other affiliations 
Mumenthaler is a board member of the Geneva Association, the Swiss American Chamber of Commerce and the International Risk Governance Council.

Publications 
 Self-correcting distance geometry for the automatic assignment of NMR NOESY spectra and the prediction of protein tertiary structures. Zürich 1996. Dissertation ETH Zürich, No. 11995, 1996, .

References

External links 
Christian Mumenthaler on the Swiss Re website. (CV February 2018 PDF)
Radio SRF 4 News: Christian Mumenthaler: "I'm actually an optimist" (Interview from January 28, 2019)

1969 births
ETH Zurich alumni
Living people
Swiss chief executives